The 1956–57 season was Chelsea Football Club's forty-third competitive season.

Table

References

External links
 1956–57 season at stamford-bridge.com

1956–57
English football clubs 1956–57 season